Stegastein  is a scenic overlook on Sogn og Fjordane County Road 243 in Norway.
This project is part of a national program of tourist routes commissioned by the Norwegian Highway Department.

References

External links

Scenic viewpoints
Aurland
Outdoor structures in Norway
Tourist attractions in Norway